Herma Szabo (22 February 1902 – 7 May 1986) was an Austrian figure skater who competed in ladies' singles and pairs. As a single skater, she became the 1924 Olympic champion and a five-time world champion (1922–1926). She also won two world titles in pairs with Ludwig Wrede.

Personal life
Szabo was born in Vienna, where she came from a family of figure skaters.  Her mother was Christa von Szabo, a two-time world medalist in pairs figure skating and her uncle was Eduard Engelmann Jr., a three time European Champion in men's figure skating, who built the first artificial ice rink. As a result, Szabo was exposed to the sport at a young age, where she practiced at her uncle's ice rink along with her cousins Helene Engelmann and Christine Engelmann, who went on to marry   Karl Schäfer.

Career
She competed as a figure skater under different surnames, which include von Szabó, Plank-Szabo, Planck-Szabo, Jarosz-Szabo and Jaross-Szabo. The International Skating Union uses the surname Szabo to refer to her accomplishments.  Szabo won the gold medal at the 1924 Winter Olympics in ladies figure skating. At the Olympics, she helped modernize ladies's figure skating by wearing a skirt cut above the knee. High-cut skirts allowed for more freedom of movement in the legs. Despite this, Sonja Henie is usually credited with being the first to wear short skirts in competition.

Szabo did not compete in the Europeans because the ladies and pair events were not established until 1930. However, she won five consecutive world titles in ladies' figure skating from 1922 to 1926. She is one of four women to have won the World title five times, the others being Sonja Henie, Carol Heiss, and Michelle Kwan.

In addition, she was also an early pioneer in pairs figure skating, where she competed with Ludwig Wrede. They won the World title twice, in 1925 and 1927, and placed third in 1926. She is the only skater to hold a simultaneous world titles in pairs and singles.

With her accomplishments, she is considered to be one of the most decorated figure skaters of all time.

Retirement
She retired in 1927 after she was defeated by Sonja Henie of Norway at the World Championships. This result was controversial because the judging panel consisted of three Norwegians, a German, and an Austrian. The three Norwegian judges placed Henie first, while the German and Austrian judges placed Szabo first.

She became disillusioned with the sport and never skated competitively again. Henie offered her a rematch years later, but she refused to participate. Her abrupt retirement, led her partner Wrede, to find a different partner for the 1928 Olympic Games, but not with the same success.

Despite the bitter end to her career, Szabo was inducted into the World Figure Skating Hall of Fame in 1982. She died at age 84 in Rottenmann, Styria.

Results

Ladies' singles

Pairs with Ludwig Wrede

See also
List of Austrians in sports

References

External links
Engelmann family history (in German). English translation.
Picture of Herma Szabo

Navigation

Austrian female single skaters
Austrian female pair skaters
Figure skaters at the 1924 Winter Olympics
Olympic figure skaters of Austria
Olympic gold medalists for Austria
1902 births
1986 deaths
Figure skaters from Vienna
Olympic medalists in figure skating
World Figure Skating Championships medalists
Medalists at the 1924 Winter Olympics